The Mausoleum of Augustus is a large tomb built by the Roman Emperor Augustus in 28 BC on the Campus Martius in Rome, Italy. The mausoleum is located on the Piazza Augusto Imperatore, near the corner with Via di Ripetta as it runs along the Tiber. The grounds cover an area equivalent to a few city blocks nestled between the church of San Carlo al Corso and the Museum of the Ara Pacis. The mausoleum has been restored and reopened to the public in March 2021, after fourteen years of closure.

Description
The mausoleum was one of the first projects initiated by Augustus in the city of Rome following his victory at the Battle of Actium in 31 BC. The mausoleum was circular in plan, consisting of several concentric rings of earth and brick, faced with travertine on the exterior, and planted with cypresses on the top tier. The whole structure was capped (possibly, as reconstructions are unsure at best) by a conical roof and a huge bronze statue of Augustus.

Vaults held up the roof and opened up the burial spaces below. Twin pink granite obelisks flanked the arched entryway; these have been removed; one now stands at the Piazza dell'Esquilino (on the north-west side of the Basilica of Santa Maria Maggiore) and the other at the Quirinal fountain. The completed mausoleum measured 90 m (295 ft) in diameter by 42 m (137 ft) in height.

A corridor ran from the entryway into the heart of the mausoleum, where there was a chamber with three niches to hold the golden urns enshrining the ashes of the Imperial Family. Two pillars flanking the entrance were mounted with bronze plaques inscribed with the Res Gestae Divi Augusti, the document describing Augustus' accomplishments and victories. Surrounding the mausoleum was landscaped parkland akin to modern public parks, affording a place of retreat at the heart of Rome's heavily urbanized Campus Martius.

The Roman poet Martial wrote about the building:

Pour me a double measure, of Falernian, Callistus,

and you Alcimus, melt over it summer snows,

let my sleek hair be soaked with excess of perfume,

my brow be wearied beneath the sewn-on rose.

The Mausoleum tells us to live, that one nearby,

it teaches us that the gods themselves can die.

Post-Classical history
The traditional story is that in 410, during the sack of Rome by Alaric, the pillaging Visigoths rifled the vaults, stole the urns and scattered the ashes, without damaging the structure of the building. Platner and Ashby, however, posited that "The story of its plundering by Alaric in 410 has no historical foundation, and we know nothing of its destruction".

By the end of the 10th century, the mausoleum had become largely buried under earth and overgrown with trees, to the point where it was referred to as the Mons Augustus. A legend of the time referred to a supposed decree by Augustus who ordered that a basketful of earth from every province of the empire was to be thrown upon his tomb, so that he could rest on the soil of the whole world over which he ruled. Atop the Mausoleum stood a chapel built to the Archangel Michael, while alongside was the Church of Santa Maria (or perhaps Martina) in Augusto (later transformed into San Giacomo degli Incurabili).

By the 12th century, the tumulus was fortified as a castleas was the mausoleum of Hadrian, which was turned into the Castel Sant'Angeloand occupied by the Colonna family. After the disastrous defeat of the Commune of Rome at the hands of the Count of Tusculum in 1167, the Colonna were disgraced and banished, and their fortification in the Campo was dismantled. Throughout the Renaissance it passed through the ownership of several major Roman families, who used it as a garden; at the beginning of the 19th century it was in use as a circus.

In the early 20th century, the interior of the Mausoleum was used as a concert hall called the Augusteo, until Benito Mussolini ordered it closed in the 1930s and restored it to the status of an archaeological site. The restoration of the Mausoleum of Augustus to a place of prominence featured in Mussolini's ambitious reordering of the city of Rome which strove to connect the aspirations of Italian Fascism with the former glories of the Roman Empire. Mussolini viewed himself especially connected to the achievements of Augustus, seeing himself as a 'reborn Augustus' ready to usher in a new age of Italian dominance.

Restoration

In January 2017, Italian authorities announced a €6 million grant from Telecom Italia for a comprehensive restoration of the Mausoleum of Augustus, allowing it to open to the public for the first time since the 1970s. The Mausoleum would be fully restored and incorporate a multi-media exhibition to project images of modern and ancient Rome onto the interior walls of the structure. Although it was announced in 2017 that the full restoration would be completed by April 2019, the Mausoleum was still not open to the public at the end of 2019.

An earlier intention to restore the Mausoleum in time to commemorate the 2,000th anniversary of Augustus' death in 2014 failed due to funding shortfalls. The neglect of the Mausoleum, closed to the public, overgrown with vegetation and used as a dumping ground for litter, had long attracted criticism, especially after the opening of the Ara Pacis museum across the street in 2006. Following the renovations the press reported that the Mausoleum was due to reopen to the public in the spring of 2021. The cost of the restoration work was 11 million euros. It was sponsored by the foundation of TIM Group, formerly Telecom Italia.

The Mausoleum opened to visitors in 2021, and the final restoration work, including the central cylinder housing Augustus' burial chamber, is scheduled to be completed in 2022.

Burials

Included among those whose remains were laid inside the mausoleum before the death of Augustus were:
 Marcus Claudius Marcellus (son of Octavia Minor), who was the first to be buried there, in 23 BC
 Marcus Vipsanius Agrippa (husband of Julia the Elder)
 Nero Claudius Drusus (son of Livia Drusilla; husband of Antonia Minor and father of Claudius)
 Octavia Minor (sister of Augustus)
 Gaius Caesar and Lucius Caesar (grandsons of Augustus)

After the death of Augustus, the mausoleum hosted the remains of:
 Augustus
 Livia Drusilla (wife of Augustus)
 Tiberius
 Drusus Julius Caesar (son of Tiberius)
 Germanicus (son of Antonia Minor)
 Agrippina the Elder (daughter of Julia the Elder)
 Nero Julius Caesar (son of Agrippina the Elder)
 Julia Livilla (daughter of Germanicus)
 Drusus Caesar (son of Germanicus)
 Antonia Minor (mother of Claudius)
 Caligula
 Julia Drusilla (daughter of Caligula)
 Claudius
 Britannicus (son of Claudius)

 Nerva, the last emperor for whom the mausoleum was opened

See also
 
 
 Catacombs of Rome
 List of ancient monuments in Rome

References

External links
 Mausoleum Augusti at LacusCurtius
 Images of the Mausoleum of Augustus
 

 
Buildings and structures completed in the 1st century BC
Roman emperors' mausoleums
Mausoleums in Rome
Augustan building projects
Ancient Roman buildings and structures in Rome
Rome R. IV Campo Marzio
Campus Martius